is a Japanese singer-songwriter and YouTuber. He is currently signed under the record label Ariola Japan.

Career 

He began his singing career as a vocalist for the four-man rock band, The Bugzy, until they disbanded in May 2019. After the group's disbandment, he began performing live on the streets of Tokyo. On October 10, 2019, Yuuri was singing [「花 」-0714-] by My First Story on the street at the scrambled intersection in Shibuya. It became a hot topic when My First Story vocalist Hiro, jumped in and sang the second verse of the song with him. After this incident, Yuuri was called out from the crowd to perform spontaneously for the encore final performance on November 30 when My First Story was holding a concert in Saitama Super Arena as a part of their country-wide tour "My First Story Tour 2019." Yuuri's originally composed "Kakurenbo" whose recording was supervised by Hiro and My First Story's [「花」 -0714-] were performed together. On December 1, Yuuri released "Kakurenbo" independently. It ranked in 4th place on the general chart on iTunes Japan, and the music video garnered over 40 million views. On the same day, MY FIRST STORY'S version of "Kakurenbo" was also released.

On February 28, 2020 he released his second independent song, titled "Kagome", which later topped the USEN indies chart on March 18. He made his official debut with Sony Music on August 9 with his single "Peter Pan". On October 25, his second major single, "Dry Flower" was released.

On February 1, 2021 "Dry Flower" exceeded over 100 million streams on the Streaming Songs chart on Billboard Japan. He achieved this number after charting for 13 weeks, becoming the first solo male artist to achieve this, and overall third artist to achieve this following LiSA's "Homura" which broke the record after 7 weeks of charting, and BTS' "Dynamite" which took 11 weeks. On March 22, 2021, "Kakurenbo" also exceeded over 100 million streams on Billboard Japan’s Streaming Songs chart. It is the first time in Billboard Japan history for an artist to have two songs exceed 100 million streams only 8 months after their major debut.

On September 1, 2021, "Dry Flower" exceeded 400 million streams on Billboard Japan’s Streaming Songs chart. Since it exceeded 400 million streams within 44 weeks of charting, Yuuri became the first and fastest solo male artist to achieve this record, and the second artist overall following BTS’ "Dynamite." He also became the first Japanese artist and solo male artist to exceed 500 million streams on December 22, 2021.

His first studio album Ichi was released on January 12, 2022. He also released his first non-Japanese single, the English version of "Dry Flower" called "Dried Flowers" on January 31, 2022.

Personal life 
When Yuuri was in elementary school, he was influenced by his mother who listened to Western rock music, so he often listened to artists such as Bon Jovi, Queen, and AC/DC. Bon Jovi inspired him to become a singer and pursue music as a career. When he entered high school, he started listening to Japanese artists such as Bump of Chicken and Spitz.
His height is around 5'5.
He started his Youtube channel 「Yuuri Channel Official 」in March 2020. Since its inception, the channel has garnered over 217 million views and gained over 1 million subscribers. There are 4 main members that create and participate in the channel's content including Yuuri. The other three members are Jun, Genta, and Nari.
The contents of the channel range from song covers performed by Yuuri, to karaoke challenges with other guests, and other various contents relating to music, and a new video is uploaded daily.

Discography

Studio albums

Singles

As lead artist

As featured artist

Productions 
 April 30, 2021 – Jun Miyasaka "Shutter": Lyrics and composition by Yuuri.
 December 24, 2021 – Junta "Waraeyo": Lyrics co-written by Yuuri and CHIMERAZ. Composition by Yuuri.
 March 23, 2022 – BAK "Time Machine": Lyrics and composition by Yuuri.
 April 20, 2022 – Little Glee Monster 「心に空を」(The sky inside my heart)
 April 28, 2022 – Ai Tomioka "Rapunzel": Lyrics and composition by Yuuri.
 May 26, 2022 – Maruri "Sukidayo": Lyrics and composition by Yuuri.
 August 24, 2022 – Hey! Say! JUMP "Bitter Chocolate": Lyrics and composition by Yuuri.

Appearances

Radio 
October 7, 2020 – Midnight Kakurenbo on FM Yokohama.

THE FIRST TAKE  
 
 Premiered July 10,2020 - "Kakurenbo" THE HOME TAKE
 Premiered October 30,2020 - "Dry Flower" THE FIRST TAKE
 Premiered October 1,2021 - "Shutter" THE FIRST TAKE
 Premiered October 13,2021 - "BETELGEUSE" THE FIRST TAKE
 Premiered August,19 2022 - "Leo" THE FIRST TAKE
 Premiered August 31,2022 - "Tag" THE FIRST TAKE

Music videos

Awards and nominations

References

External links 
Yuuri Official Website
 Yuuri – Sony Music Official Site JP
 Yuuri Official Goods Store – official-goods-store.jp
 Yuuri – Ariola Japan
 
 
 
 
 
 

1994 births
Living people
21st-century Japanese male singers
Musicians from Chiba Prefecture
Japanese male singer-songwriters